The 1935 Boston Red Sox season was the 35th season in the franchise's Major League Baseball history. The Red Sox finished fourth in the American League (AL) with a record of 78 wins and 75 losses, 16 games behind the Detroit Tigers, who went on to win the 1935 World Series. This was the Red Sox' first season with more wins than losses since 1918.

Regular season

Season standings

Record vs. opponents

Opening Day lineup

Roster

Player stats

Batting

Starters by position 
Note: Pos = Position; G = Games played; AB = At bats; H = Hits; Avg. = Batting average; HR = Home runs; RBI = Runs batted in

Other batters 
Note: G = Games played; AB = At bats; H = Hits; Avg. = Batting average; HR = Home runs; RBI = Runs batted in

Pitching

Starting pitchers 
Note: G = Games pitched; IP = Innings pitched; W = Wins; L = Losses; ERA = Earned run average; SO = Strikeouts

Other pitchers 
Note: G = Games pitched; IP = Innings pitched; W = Wins; L = Losses; ERA = Earned run average; SO = Strikeouts

Relief pitchers 
Note: G = Games pitched; W = Wins; L = Losses; SV = Saves; ERA = Earned run average; SO = Strikeouts

Farm system 

Shreveport franchise transferred to Gladewater and renamed, June 4, 1935

References

External links
1935 Boston Red Sox team page at Baseball Reference
1935 Boston Red Sox season at baseball-almanac.com

Boston Red Sox seasons
Boston Red Sox
Boston Red Sox
1930s in Boston